Nora Valdez (born 9 September 1997) is a Colombian compound archer. She won the gold medal in the women's team event at the 2017 World Archery Championships held in Mexico City, Mexico. In 2021, she also won the gold medal in the women's team event at the World Archery Championships held in Yankton, United States.

References

External links
 

Living people
1997 births
Place of birth missing (living people)
Colombian female archers
World Archery Championships medalists
21st-century Colombian women